Wing Ping Tsuen is a village in the San Tin area of Yuen Long District, Hong Kong.

Administration
Wing Ping Tsuen is a recognized village under the New Territories Small House Policy.

See also
 Tai Fu Tai Mansion

References

External links

 Delineation of area of existing village Wing Ping Tsuen (San Tin) for election of resident representative (2019 to 2022)
 Antiquities and Monuments Office. Hong Kong Traditional Chinese Architectural Information System. Wing Ping Tsuen
 Antiquities Advisory Board. Historic Building Appraisal. Tung Shan Temple, Wing Ping Tsuen Pictures

Villages in Yuen Long District, Hong Kong
San Tin